Midgeholme is a hamlet and civil parish in City of Carlisle district, Cumbria, England. At the 2001 census the parish had a population of 67.

The hamlet of Midgeholme and the disused Midgeholme Coalfield are in the north east of the parish, near the A689 road between Brampton and Lambley.

Listed buildings 
 the only listed building in the parish is Tarn House, built in the late 15th century and extended and altered in 1843, at Grade II*.
It overlooks Tindale Tarn, the north shore of which forms the boundary with Farlam parish.

References

External links
 Cumbria County History Trust: Midgeholme (nb: provisional research only – see Talk page)
 

Hamlets in Cumbria
Civil parishes in Cumbria
City of Carlisle